"Opal Mantra" is a song by Northern Irish rock band Therapy?, released as a single on 16 August 1993 through A&M Records. It was issued on clear 7-inch vinyl, blue 7-inch vinyl, CD digipak, CD, and cassette. It reached number 14 on the UK Singles Chart, number six on the Irish Singles Chart, and number 30 on the Swedish Singles Chart.

The single was backed by three live tracks on most formats in the UK and Ireland. The lead track did not appear on any Therapy? album but was included on the Hats Off to the Insane mini-album released in North America and Japan. All four tracks appear on the Born in a Crash mini-album released in Europe.

Track listings

Personnel
 Andy Cairns – vocals, guitar
 Fyfe Ewing – drums
 Michael McKeegan – bass
 Chris Sheldon & Therapy? - producer
 John Mallison – assistant engineer and owner of aforementioned Opel Manta
 Chris Leckie – engineer on live tracks
 Lewis Mulatero – photography
 Simon Carrington – design
 Graham Tunna – design

Charts

References

1993 singles
Therapy? songs
1993 songs
Song recordings produced by Chris Sheldon
A&M Records singles
Song articles with missing songwriters